Dormah Kola (also Romanized as Dormah Kolā; also known as Dormah Kolā-ye Bālā) is a village in Bala Khiyaban-e Litkuh Rural District, in the Central District of Amol County, Mazandaran Province, Iran. At the 2006 census, its population was 275, in 76 families.

References 

Populated places in Amol County